The 2009 Montreal Alouettes season was the 43rd season for the team in the Canadian Football League and their 55th overall. The Alouettes won their sixth Grey Cup championship, 28–27 against the Saskatchewan Roughriders, in a game the Montreal Alouettes trailed throughout, as they came back from trailing  27–11 four minutes into the fourth quarter. It was their first win since 2002, and it ended a streak of four Grey Cup losses in their last four appearances.

The Alouettes finished in first place in the East Division setting a new franchise record of 15–3. It was the first time a team finished with a 15–3 record since the 1997 Toronto Argonauts.

Off-season

CFL draft 
The 2009 CFL Draft took place on May 2, 2009. The Alouettes selected Calgary Dinos lineman Dylan Steenbergen in the first round, seventh overall.

Preseason

 Games played with colour uniforms.

Regular season

Season standings

Season schedule 

 Games played with colour uniforms.
 Games played with white uniforms.
 Games played with alternate uniforms.
 Games played with alternate uniforms.
 Games played with retro uniforms.

Roster

Playoffs

Schedule

 Games played with colour uniforms.
 Games played with white uniforms.

Bracket

*=Team won in Overtime.

East Final 
Date and time: Sunday, November 22, 1:00 PM Eastern Standard TimeVenue: Olympic Stadium, Montreal, Quebec

Grey Cup 
Date and time: Sunday, November 29, 6:30 PM Eastern Standard TimeVenue: McMahon Stadium, Calgary, Alberta

Awards
Avon Cobourne, Most Valuable Player
Ben Cahoon, Dick Suderman Trophy (Grey Cup's Most Valuable Canadian)

References

Montreal Alouettes Season, 2009
Montreal Alouettes seasons
Grey Cup championship seasons